Clonlara, officially Cloonlara, is a village in County Clare, Ireland, and a Roman Catholic parish of the same name.

Village and amenities
Clonlara is in the east of County Clare in the civil parish of Kiltonanlea or Doonass, barony of Tulla Lower. It lies between the River Shannon to the east and the Clare hills to the west and north. Clonlara village is on the road between Killaloe and Limerick. In 1841 there were 219 people in 31 houses. The village lies beside the head-race canal that deliver water to power the Ardnacrusha power plant a few kilometres to the southwest.

Clonlara has an equestrian centre and a Gaelic Athletic Association club, Clonlara GAA.

Religion
The village is part of Clonlara (Doonas and Truagh) parish of the Roman Catholic Diocese of Killaloe, and the Church of Ireland parish of Kiltenanlea. The parish has two churches: Mary, the Mother of God (Truagh) and St Senan's (Clonlara), both Roman Catholic. Kiltenanlea's Protestant church (Church of Ireland) is no longer a functioning parish church, but is used for weddings and seasonal carol services.

In 1956 in Clonlara, a group of people were reputedly prompted by a local Catholic curate to physically assault two Jehovah's Witnesses and to burn the literature which they had been trying to distribute. Several people were charged for involvement in the "Clonlara affair". While Taoiseach John A. Costello reportedly "responded to a protest from Bishop Joseph Rodgers of Killaloe" by writing that he "appreciated 'the just indignation aroused among the clergy and the people by the activities of the Jehovah’s Witnesses'", he also "insisted that the law had to be upheld".

Notable people
 Marcus Horan, Irish rugby union player
 Colm Honan and Darach Honan, hurlers
 Jan O'Sullivan, Labour Party Teachta Dála (TD) and former Minister for Education

See also
 List of towns and villages in Ireland

References

Towns and villages in County Clare
Parishes of the Roman Catholic Diocese of Killaloe